Alruba, a name derived from Arabic for "the foal", is a suspected astrometric binary star system in the northern circumpolar constellation of Draco. It is just barely visible to the naked eye as a dim point of light with an apparent visual magnitude of 5.76. The system is drifting closer with a radial velocity of −2 km/s.

The visible component is an A-type main-sequence star with a stellar classification of A0 V. It is about 58 million years old with three times the mass of the Sun and has a high rate of spin, showing a projected rotational velocity of 170 km/s. The star is radiating 147 times the luminosity of the Sun from its photosphere at an effective temperature of 9,226 K. The system is a source for X-ray emission, which is most likely coming from the unseen companion.

Nomenclature 

In the Henry Draper catalogue this system has the designation HD 161693, while it has the identifier HR 6618 in the Bright Star Catalogue.

It bore the traditional Arabic name الربع Al Rubaʽ "the foal" (specifically a young camel born in the spring), a member of the Mother Camels asterism in early Arabic astronomy.

In 2016, the International Astronomical Union organized a Working Group on Star Names (WGSN) to catalogue and standardize proper names for stars. The WGSN approved the name Alruba for this star on 1 June 2018 and it is now so entered on the List of IAU-approved Star Names.

References

A-type main-sequence stars
Draco (constellation)
161693
086782
6618
Alruba
Stars named from the Arabic language
BD+53 1978